Parish Assembly  may refer to:

 Parish Assembly (Jersey), the assembly of local government in Jersey
 Assembleia de freguesia, the assembly of LAU 2 local government in Portugal